Alsasua (in Spanish, Altsasu in Basque; official name: Altsasu/Alsasua) is a town located in the autonomous community of Navarre, northern Spain.  Its population in 2017 was 7,419. The Battle of Alsasua took place here in 1834. 30 years later the town turned into a railway hub, transforming its demography, economy, and cultural landscape. In 2016, a fight erupting in a bar escalated into an Audiencia Nacional judicial case that stirred the town.

References

External links
 ALTSASU/ALSASUA in the Bernardo Estornés Lasa - Auñamendi Encyclopedia (Euskomedia Fundazioa) 

Municipalities in Navarre